Robert Andrew may refer to:
Robert Andrew (died 1437), MP for Cricklade and Wiltshire
Robert Andrew (field hockey) (born 1942), represented Australia at the 1972 Summer Olympics
Robert Andrew (golfer) (born ), Scottish golfer
Robert Andrew (MP for Ipswich), MP for Ipswich 1391 and 1393
 Robert Lynal Andrew (born 1944), politician in Saskatchewan, Canada
Rob Andrew (born 1963), English rugby union player

See also

Robert Andrews (disambiguation)